The 2001 Allan Cup was the Canadian senior ice hockey championship for the 2000–01 senior "AAA" season.  The event was hosted by the Petrolia Squires in Sarnia, Ontario. The 2001 tournament marked the 93rd year that the Allan Cup has been awarded.

Teams
Dundas Real McCoys (East)
Lloydminster Border Kings (West)
Petrolia Squires (Host)
Stony Plain Eagles (Pacific)

Results
Round Robin
Lloydminster Border Kings 5 - Dundas Real McCoys 3
Petrolia Squires 3 - Stony Plain Eagles 1
Lloydminster Border Kings 10 - Stony Plain Eagles 3
Dundas Real McCoys 8 - Petrolia Squires 0
Stony Plain Eagles 4 - Dundas Real McCoys 1
Petrolia Squires 2 - Lloydminster Border Kings 2
Semi-final
Petrolia Squires 3 - Stony Plain Eagles 0
Final
Lloydminster Border Kings 7 - Petrolia Squires 2

External links
Allan Cup archives 
Allan Cup website

Allan Cup
Sport in Sarnia
Allan